Maja Grozdanić (born 1 May 1981) is a Serbian swimmer. She competed in the women's 200 metre backstroke event at the 1996 Summer Olympics.

References

1981 births
Living people
Serbian female swimmers
Olympic swimmers of Yugoslavia
Swimmers at the 1996 Summer Olympics
Sportspeople from Belgrade